Kirby's Dream Collection Special Edition is a 2012 video game developed by HAL Laboratory and published by Nintendo for the Wii system. It is an anthology disc celebrating the 20th anniversary of the Kirby series, which took place on April 27, 2012. The game was released in Japan on July 19, 2012 and in North America on September 16, 2012. It was not released in PAL regions, and was the final first-party Wii game released in North America.

Content

Kirby's Dream Collection includes six playable Kirby titles originally released between 1992 and 2000 on the Game Boy, NES, SNES and Nintendo 64. In addition to the GameCube Controller and Classic Controller, all six games have been calibrated for use with the Wii Remote turned horizontally. The game supports up to four players depending on which game is chosen. Like the other four games in the collection, the Game Boy games (Kirby's Dream Land and Kirby's Dream Land 2) are emulated via the Wii's "Virtual Console" interface, complete with the "suspending play" and manual features, despite Game Boy titles never being released on the service via the Wii Shop Channel. All six games had previously been released separately on the Virtual Console via the Wii Shop Channel and 3DS eShop.

Kirby's Dream Collection also features 13 new challenge stages based on those found in 2011's Kirby's Return to Dream Land. An additional museum section features box art and video spotlights for every game in the Kirby series released through 2012, along with three viewable episodes from the anime television series Kirby: Right Back at Ya! ("Kirby Comes to Cappy Town", "Crusade for the Blade", and "Waddle While You Work"). In addition to the game disc, the package includes a booklet that highlights Kirby's history and provides behind-the-scenes trivia about the series, as well as a soundtrack CD containing 42 music tracks from past Kirby games and three new arrangements by the HAL Laboratory sound team.

Reception and sales

Kirby's Dream Collection sold over 100,000 copies in Japan during its first week of release. The collection was positively received, holding an aggregate score of 81.29% on GameRankings and 82/100 on Metacritic. Critics praised the quality of the games and the amount of content included in the collection, though some criticized the awkward use of the Virtual Console interface when switching games. Others lamented the absence of more obscure spinoff games like Kirby's Pinball Land and Kirby's Dream Course, which they felt would have added more variety and appeal.

Notes

References

2012 video games
HAL Laboratory games
Kirby (series) video games
Nintendo video game compilations
Video games developed in Japan
Wii games
Wii-only games
Video games scored by Jun Ishikawa
Video games scored by Hirokazu Ando
Video games scored by Shogo Sakai
Video games produced by Kensuke Tanabe